Milano Forlanini is an overground railway station in Milan, Italy that serves the southern part of the suburb of Lambrate. It opened in 2015 as part of the Milan Passante railway. It is located on Viale Enrico Forlanini. The train services are operated by Trenord.

It connects with Line 4 of the Milan Metro.

Train services
The station is served by the following services:

Milan Metropolitan services (S5) Varese - Rho - Milan - Treviglio
Milan Metropolitan services (S6) Novara - Rho - Milan - Treviglio
Milan Metropolitan services (S9) Saronno - Seregno - Milan - Albairate

See also
Railway stations in Milan
Milan suburban railway service

References

Forlanini
Railway stations opened in 2015
Milan S Lines stations
2015 establishments in Italy
Railway stations in Italy opened in the 21st century